Die Geisterinsel is a Singspiel in 3 acts by Johann Rudolf Zumsteeg for Stuttgart, but premiered in 1805 in Dresden. A recording featuring Christiane Karg, Falko Hönisch, Benjamin Hulett, Sophie Harmsen, Patrick Pobeschin, Christian Immler, Kammerchor Stuttgart, Hofkapelle Stuttgart, Frieder Bernius was issued on Carus in 2011.

References

1805 operas
Operas
German-language operas
Operas based on The Tempest
Singspiele